Poa nemoralis, the wood bluegrass, is a perennial plant in the family Poaceae. The late-growing grass is fairly nutritious for livestock, which feed on it in the autumn, and it is used as a lawn grass for shady situations.

Description
It forms loose tufts, and is of a more delicate, slender appearance than other meadow grasses. It is slightly creeping. The leaves are narrow, tapering to a point. The ligules are short (0.5 mm). The panicle is slender, loose and branched. The spikelets are few and egg shaped. They have one to five flowers. This grass is in flower from June to August in the Northern Hemisphere. It can produce asexual seeds by means of apomixis and can also reproduce vegetatively.

Because of the characteristic lamina, similar to a stretched out arm, it is sometimes called "Wegweisergras" (signpost grass) in Germany.

Distribution and habitat
Wood bluegrass is native to Europe, where its range extends from Portugal to Bulgaria, and Asia where its range extends from Iran to Japan. It has been introduced Australia and New Zealand, and to North America where it has become naturalised in southeastern Canada and northeastern United States.  Shade tolerant, it is often found in forests and grows up to half a metre tall. It is generally distributed in Britain in dry woods, thickets and shady hedge banks on well drained soils. In its invasive range in America, it sometimes grows in coniferous forests, where its presence is thought to increase the risk of fires, and on floodplains, the banks of rivers and lakes, and disturbed sites. In the British Isles it is found throughout the United Kingdom but at more scattered locations in Ireland, where it may have been introduced.

Footnotes

References
 
  (2007): Bildatlas der Farn- und Blütenpflanzen Deutschlands. Ulmer Verlag  (in German)
 The Observers Book of Grasses, Sedges and Rushes. Frances Rose. pp. 46–47
 Grasses, Ferns, Mosses and Lichens. (1980) Phillips, Roger p64

External links

Poa nemoralis photo
Swedish Museum of Natural History: Poa nemoralis
 The Ohio State University: Poa nemoralis
Jepson Manual Treatment
USDA Plant Profile Poa nemoralis
Grass Manual Treatment

nemoralis
Grasses of Europe
Grasses of Asia
Grasses of North America
Flora of Europe
Flora of Asia
Flora of North America
Plants described in 1753
Taxa named by Carl Linnaeus